The 2023 Victorian Football League season will be the 141st season of the Victorian Football Association/Victorian Football League, a second-tier Australian rules football competition played in the states of Victoria, New South Wales, and Queensland. The season will commence on 25 March and conclude with the Grand Final on 24 September.

Premiership season
 Source: Click here

Round 1

Round 2

Round 3

Round 4

Round 5

Round 6

Round 7

Round 8

Round 9

Ladder

Wildcard Round
The season introduced a wildcard round, played after the home-and-away season is complete, but not considered part of the finals series. The seventh placed team will play the tenth placed team and the eighth placed team will play the ninth placed team. The winners will advance to the eight-team finals series, assuming the seventh and eighth positions under the AFL finals system.

Finals series

Qualifying and Elimination Finals

Semi-finals

Preliminary Finals

Grand Final

See also 
 List of VFA/VFL premiers
 Victorian Football League
 Australian Football League
 2023 AFL season
 2023 VFL Women's season

References

Victorian Football League seasons
VFL